The Mid-America Classic is a long-standing American college football rivalry game played in most years since 1901 between the Panthers of Eastern Illinois University and the Redbirds of Illinois State University. The 2022 season marked the 110th meeting between the two teams with Illinois State's win extending their lead in the series to 59–42–9.

History
The rivalry between the two schools began in 1901 and is the oldest in the state of Illinois. It has continued almost completely uninterrupted through the years as the Panthers and Redbirds played in the Illinois Intercollegiate Athletic Conference until it disbanded in 1970. They would play in different conferences until 1985 when they both joined the newly formed football arm of the Gateway Collegiate Athletic Conference, previously a league that sponsored only women's sports. After the Gateway merged with the Missouri Valley Conference in 1992, its football side was spun off into the Gateway Football Conference (now the Missouri Valley Football Conference), with both teams remaining in that league until the Panthers moved their entire athletic program to the Ohio Valley Conference in 1995. Even though annual meetings are no longer assured, the two sides have met almost every year since, including twice in 2006. The two teams have played 110 times in total, with Illinois State holding a 59–42–9 advantage in the all-time series.

For the 100th game in the series, in 2012, representatives from the two schools met and decided to give the rivalry the name of Mid-America Classic. The two schools also collaborated on a traveling trophy, which holds plaques with the results of the previous 100 games in the series and has room for results of future games in the series.

Notable games
October 27, 1906 – Illinois State's six-hour bus drive to Charleston, Ill., was only made worse by an 11–6 defeat.

November 3, 1915 – Both teams fumbled inside each other's 10-yard line in this 0–0 game played at EIU.

November 11, 1916 – EIU visited Normal, Ill., for the first ever Homecoming game on Illinois State's campus. ISU scored its only points on a 45-yard blocked punt by Ritter in a 24–7 loss.

November 5, 1921 – ISU rolled to a 42–3 victory in its Homecoming game, as five different ISU players scored a touchdown (Brown, Stewart, Clark, Jensen, Frkyman).

November 14, 1959 – Illinois State linemen wear gloves for the first time on a snowy, icy day, as Dave Babcock scored the only Illinois State touchdown in a 6–6 tie.

September 30, 1961 – Illinois State's Keith Reiger's touchdown pass to Bill Monken "probably set an IIAC record for the shortest TD pass: 18 inches" in the Redbirds' 18–0 win.

September 29, 1962 – Paul Whitmore's 91-yard punt return was the only score in this 6–0 Redbird victory. It still remains the longest punt return for a touchdown in Illinois State history.

October 10, 1981 – ISU reserve Andy Fladung came off the bench to intercept a school-record four passes in the Redbirds' 25–3 win.

September 16, 2006 – Marked the first time in the history of the Illinois State-Eastern Illinois series where both teams were nationally ranked. The Redbirds entered the game No. 7 and Panthers were ranked No. 18. ISU trailed, 10–0, after the first quarter, but a 23-point second quarter put the 'Birds in control of a 44–30 win. Pierre Jackson had a career-high 132 receiving yards on six catches.

November 25, 2006 – Two months after facing each other in the regular season, ISU and EIU met each other in the first round of the 2006 NCAA Division I FCS Playoffs. ISU's Jason Tate (41 yards) and Jesse Caesar (45 yards) each returned interceptions for touchdowns in the 24–13 Redbird win.

September 15, 2012 – Matt Brown accounted for seven touchdowns, and his fifth scoring pass of the game, a 25-yarder to Tyrone Walker in the second overtime period, capped a career-high 473-yard performance and gave Illinois State a 54–51 victory over Eastern Illinois.

Game results

See also 
 List of NCAA college football rivalry games
 List of most-played college football series in NCAA Division I

References

College football rivalries in the United States
Illinois State Redbirds football
Eastern Illinois Panthers football
Recurring sporting events established in 1901
1901 establishments in Illinois